The Metropolitan Police (Receiver) Act 1861 or the Metropolitan Police Receiver's Act 1861 (24 & 25 Vict c 124), sometimes called the Metropolitan Police District Receiver Act, was an Act of the Parliament of the United Kingdom. This Act has, in addition to its other short titles, been given the short title the Metropolitan Police Act 1861, but that short title has also been given to the Act 24 & 25 Vict c 51. The Metropolitan Police (Receiver) Act 1861 is one of the Metropolitan Police Acts 1829 to 1895.

It dealt with the position of Receiver of the Metropolitan Police, repealing parts of Section 25 of the Metropolitan Police Act 1829 (Section 7) and making the office a corporation sole (Section 1). All property vested in previous holders of the role were vested in the current Receiver (Section 2). The Act continued payments into the official Receiver's account at the Bank of England by the Overseers and others (Section 8), though it also removed the Receiver's name from that account (Section 4) and for the Overseers to continue paying into . The Act also removed his personal liability for any debts he incurred in his official capacity (Section 3) and empowered him to dispose of, buy and lease property in the pursuance of his office (Section 5) and to set up allowances for widows and children of men killed in the line of duty (Section 6).

The preamble, and to "as follows", was repealed by section 1 of, and the Schedule to, the Statute Law Revision Act 1892.

Section 1
As to this section, see Metropolitan Police District Receiver v Tatum.

Sections 2 and 3
These sections were repealed by section 1(1) of, and Group 3 of Part I of the Schedule to, the Statute Law (Repeals) Act 1986.

Section 4
This section was repealed by section 1(1) of, and Group 3 of Part I of the Schedule to, the Statute Law (Repeals) Act 1986.

The words "after the passing of this Act" and "the Governor and Company of" were repealed by section 1 of, and the Schedule to, the Statute Law Revision Act 1892.

Section 5
So much of this section as relates to any police court was repealed by section 5 of, and the Schedule to, the Metropolitan Police Court (Buildings) Act 1871, "without prejudice to anything done or suffered, or any right acquired or accrued before the passing of this Act". The words from "and may purchase" onwards were repealed by section 1(1) of, and Group 3 of Part I of the Schedule to, the Statute Law (Repeals) Act 1986.

Section 6
This section was repealed by section 36 of, and the Fourth Schedule to the Police Act 1890, subject to the proviso in section 36.

Section 7
This section was repealed by section 147(1) of, and Part IV of the Second Schedule to, the Local Government Act 1948, subject to the provisions of section 147.

This section to "enacted that", and the word "that" before "the certificate", were repealed by section 1 of, and the Schedule to, the Statute Law Revision Act 1892.

Section 8
This section was repealed by section 1(1) of, and Group 3 of Part I of the Schedule to, the Statute Law (Repeals) Act 1986.

Section 10
This section was repealed by section 1 of, and the Schedule to, the Statute Law Revision Act 1892.

References
"Metropolitan Police (Receiver) Act 1861". Halsbury's Statutes of England and Wales. Fourth Edition. 2007 Reissue. Butterworths. Volume 33(2). Page 40.
"Metropolitan Police (Receiver) Act 1861". Halsbury's Statutes of England. Third Edition. Butterworths. London. 1970. Volume 25. Page 267.
"Metropolitan Police (Receiver) Act 1861". Halsbury's Statutes of England. Second Edition. Butterworth & Co (Publishers) Ltd. 1950. Volume 18. Page 83.
"The Metropolitan Police (Receiver) Act, 1861". Halsbury's Statutes of England. (The Complete Statutes of England). First Edition. Butterworth & Co (Publishers) Ltd. 1930. Volume 12  . Page 825. See also page 747.
"The Metropolitan Police (Receiver) Act, 1861". Chitty's Statutes of Practical Utility. Sixth Edition. Sweet and Maxwell. London. 1912. Volume 10. Page 167.
John Mounteney Lely. "Metropolitan Police Receiver's Act 1861". The Statutes of Practical Utility. (Chitty's Statutes). Fifth Edition. Sweet and Maxwell. Stevens and Sons. London. 1895. Volume 9. Title "Police". Subtitle "Police (Metropolis)". Pages 165 to 167.
"The Metropolitan Police (Receiver) Act, 1861". The Metropolitan Police Guide. Seventh Edition. HMSO. 1922. Page 95.

External links

United Kingdom Acts of Parliament 1861
Police legislation in the United Kingdom